Zbigniew Czerwiński (born November 18, 1982 in Poland) is a Polish speedway rider who is a medalist of 2000 Individual U-19 European Championship and 2003 Team Polish Champion.

Honours
 Individual U-19 European Championship
 2000  Ljubljana - Bronze medal (11+3 points)
 2001  Pardubice - 6th place (9 points)
 European Pairs Championship
 2008  Natschbach-Loipersbach - The Final will be on 2008-09-20 (6 points in Semi-Final)
 Individual U-21 Polish Championship
 2003 Rybnik - Bronze medal
 Team Polish Championship
 2003 - Polish Champion (with Włókniarz Częstochowa)
 2004 - Bronze medal (with Włókniarz Częstochowa)
 Polish Bronze Helmet (U-19)
 2001 Gorzów Wlkp. - 3rd place

References

See also
 Speedway in Poland

1982 births
Living people
Polish speedway riders
People from Rybnik
Sportspeople from Silesian Voivodeship